Torbett is a surname. Notable people with the surname include:

John Torbett (born 1956), American politician
Nate Torbett (born 1994), American footballer

English-language surnames